The IIFA Style Icon Award is chosen by the viewers and was given on behalf of Samsung and then  International Drama and Theatre Education Association-IDEA later on. The recipient also gets prizes such as a TV.

Winners

See also 
 IIFA Awards
 Bollywood
 Cinema of India

External links 
Official site

International Indian Film Academy Awards